The 2022 ACC Championship Game was a college football conference championship game that was played on December 3, 2022, at Bank of America Stadium in Charlotte, North Carolina to determine the champion of the Atlantic Coast Conference (ACC) for the 2022 season. The game featured the Clemson Tigers, the champion of the Atlantic Division, and the North Carolina Tar Heels, the champion of the Coastal Division. The 18th annual ACC Championship Game, the contest began at 8:00 p.m. EST and aired on ABC. Sponsored by restaurant chain Subway, the game was officially known as the Subway ACC Championship Game.

Teams
The 2022 ACC Championship Game featured the Clemson Tigers, champions of the Atlantic Division, and the North Carolina Tar Heels, champions of the Coastal Division. The last time these two teams met in the ACC Championship Game was in 2015, where the Tigers beat the Tar Heels 45-37.

Clemson

The Tigers clinched a spot in the game as the champion of the ACC's Atlantic Division following Pittsburgh's defeat of Syracuse on November 5.

North Carolina

The Tar Heels clinched a spot in the game as the champion of the ACC's Coastal Division following their defeat of Wake Forest on November 12.

Game summary

Statistics

References

Championship
ACC Championship Game

Clemson Tigers football games
North Carolina Tar Heels football games
ACC Championship Game
ACC Championship Game